Spastic can refer to:

 Spasticity, a feature of altered muscle performance
 A historical reference to people with the movement disorders, see cerebral palsy
 Spastic (word), a pejorative used against disabled people

See also 
 Scope (charity), formerly known as The Spastics Society
 "Spasticus Autisticus", a 1981 song by Ian Dury
 Spaz (disambiguation)